The Venerable Chanmyay Sayadaw U Janakābhivaṃsa, (born 24 July 1928) is a Theravada Buddhist monk from Myanmar.

Life

Early life and studies 
He was born in Pyinma village, Taungdwingyi Township, British Burma, on Tuesday, 24 July 1928. His parents were U Phyu Min and Daw Shwe Yee. He started to study the Buddhist scriptures at the age of fifteen as a novice monk. He received the higher upasampada ordination in 1947 and continued advanced studies of Buddhist scriptures. He practised Vipassana meditation under the instruction of the most Venerable Mahasi Sayadaw from 1953 to 1954. He was then invited by the State Buddha Sasana Organization to be an editor of the Buddhist scriptures in Pali  for reciting Buddhist scriptures at the Sixth Buddhist Council in Myanmar.

Starting from 1957, the Venerable Sayadaw spent six years in Colombo, Sri Lanka, where he continued his studies of English, Sanskrit, Hindi and Sinhalese languages. He returned to Myanmar in June 1963. At the invitation of the state Buddha Sasana Organisation, he took up residence at Kaba-Aye where he edited the publications of Pali Texts.

Teaching career 

In 1967, he was appointed by the Venerable Mahasi Sayadaw as a meditation teacher at Mahasi Sasana Yeiktha, Yangon. In 1977 Sayadaw Ashin Janakabhivamsa took up residence at Chanmyay Yeiktha Meditation Center which was donated to him by some devotees and became the abbot of the center. He has been since then well known as Chanmyay Sayadaw.

In 1979-1980, Chanmyay Sayadaw accompanied the Mahasi Sayadaw's Dhamma Mission to Europe and the USA. He has undertaken many Dhamma missions to countries in Asia, Europe, and the United States. As recently as July 2015, at the age of 87, he travelled to the UK, Ireland, and Canada giving Dhamma Talks.

References 
 Biography of Chanmyay Sayadaw

External links
 Chanmyay Meditation Centre
 Chanmyay Meditation Centre Myaing
 Chanmyay Meditation Centre (USA)
 Chanmyay Meditation Centre Singapore
 Chanmyay Meditation Centre Pretoria, South Africa

1928 births
Living people
Chanmay Sayadaw
Burmese Buddhist monks
People from Magway Division
Recipients of Abhivaṃsa